Stay Awake may refer to:

Music

Albums
 Stay Awake (Mike Scheidt album), 2012
 Stay Awake: Various Interpretations of Music from Vintage Disney Films, 1988

Songs
 "Stay Awake" (Dean Lewis song), 2019
 "Stay Awake" (Example song), 2011
 "Stay Awake" (Mary Poppins song), from the film Mary Poppins, 1964
 "Stay Awake", by Ellie Goulding from Halcyon, 2012
 "Stay Awake", by Field Music from Commontime, 2016
 "Stay Awake", by Juliana Hatfield from Made in China, 2005
 "Stay Awake", by London Grammar from If You Wait, 2013

Other uses
 Stay Awake (book), a 2012 collection of short stories by Dan Chaon
 "Stay Awake", a 2000 short story by Poppy Z. Brite
 The Stay Awake, a South African horror film of 1987
 "Stay Awake" (Cow and Chicken), a television episode
 Stay Awake (film), a 2022 drama film